Carola Nitschke (later Beraktschjan, born 1 March 1962) is a retired East German swimmer. She competed at the 1976 Summer Olympics in the 100 m and 200 m breaststroke and finished in fourth and sixth place, respectively. She also won a gold medal in the 4 × 100 m medley relay, though she swam only in a preliminary round. Shortly before the Olympics she set world records in the 4 × 100 m medley relay and 100 m breaststroke. She was only fourteen at the time. Next year she won a gold and a silver medal in these events at the 1977 European Aquatics Championships.

Later she admitted to taking performance-enhancing drugs as part of the East German doping program; she gave up her medals and asked to remove her name from the competition records.

References

1962 births
Living people
German female swimmers
East German female breaststroke swimmers
Olympic swimmers of East Germany
Swimmers at the 1976 Summer Olympics
European Aquatics Championships medalists in swimming
Medalists at the 1976 Summer Olympics
Olympic gold medalists for East Germany